The Prior of Fyvie (later Commendator of Fyvie) was the head of the medieval Tironensian monastic community of Fyvie Priory, located in modern Aberdeenshire, Scotland. The following is a list of priors and commendators:

List of priors

 ?
 Neso, 1312
 ?
 Albertinus, 1323-1325
 ?
 John Fewir, 1362
 Patrick de Infirmiterio, 1362-1364
 ?
 John Geby, 1371-1384
 ?
 John Scot, 1395
 ?
 John de St Andreas, 1425-1450
 Malcolm Brydy, 1450-1455 x 1456
 Alexander Mason, 1459-1508
 Robert Cuby, 1461
 George Hepburn, 1507-1513

List of commendators

 Thomas Nudry, 1516
 ?
 Thomas Currour, 1529-1531
 David Betoun, 1531
 ?

See also
 Fyvie Priory

Notes

Bibliography
 Watt, D. E. R. & Shead, N. F. (eds.), The Heads of Religious Houses in Scotland from the 12th to the 16th Centuries, The Scottish Records Society, New Series, Volume 24, (Edinburgh, 2001), pp. 85–6

Fyvie, Priors of
Fyvie, Priors of
Fyvie, Priors of